Heather Anne Guino-o (born November 27, 1997) is a Filipino volleyball player who currently plays for the Petro Gazz Angels in the Premier Volleyball League.

Clubs
 Pocari Sweat Lady Warriors (2017)
 Tacloban Fighting Warays (2018)
 Creamline Cool Smashers (2019)
 BanKo Perlas Spikers (2021)
 PLDT High Speed Hitters (2022)
 Petro Gazz Angels (2023)

Awards

Collegiate

Clubs

References

1997 births
Filipino women's volleyball players
Filipino volleyball players
Outside hitters
Living people